Rajee Samarasinghe (born January 12, 1988) is a Sri Lankan filmmaker and visual artist. His work explores a wide array of topics including the Sri Lankan Civil War, his family, and the deconstruction of documentary and narrative film.

Early life and education 
Samarasinghe was born in Colombo, Sri Lanka, in 1988, during the Sri Lankan Civil War. He moved to the United States in 1998 where he is currently based. Initially interested in illustration, his focus later shifted to film. He received a Bachelor of Fine Arts in Visual Arts (Media) from the University of California San Diego and a Master of Fine Arts in Film and Video from the California Institute of the Arts.

Career 
Samarasinghe's 2016 short film, If I Were Any Further Away I’d Be Closer to Home, premiered in the international competition at the 62nd International Short Film Festival Oberhausen. Genevieve Yue, writing for Film Comment, stated that "(Lav) Diaz’s visual lyricism was only topped by Rajee Samarasinghe’s If I Were Any Further Away I’d Be Closer to Home, a silent, black-and-white portrait of a Sri Lankan noodle-maker and his family. Shot in HD scope with a vintage anamorphic projector lens mounted to the digital camera, the film is as attentive to the rolling, cutting, and drying batches of long noodles as it is to the shifting patterns of natural light in and around their small workroom, in which a small girl stares up at the swirling dust around her." If I Were Any Further Away I’d Be Closer to Home won the Film House Award for Visionary Filmmaking at the 44th Athens International Film and Video Festival and screened at the 27th FIDMarseille as well as the 60th San Francisco International Film Festival where it was a Golden Gate Award nominee.

Samarasinghe's 2018 short film, Piṭuvahalayā (The Exile), which examines Sri Lanka's post-war era, premiered in the international competition at the 64th International Short Film Festival Oberhausen and subsequently screened at the 62nd BFI London Film Festival.

Samarasinghe's 2020 short film, The Eyes of Summer, which explores his mother's interactions with spirits during her childhood, premiered in the Tiger Short Competition at the 49th International Film Festival Rotterdam, and was included in the 49th New Directors/New Films presented by Film Society of Lincoln Center & MoMA, the 26th Slamdance Film Festival, and the 49th Festival du nouveau cinéma. The film also went on to win the Tíos Award for Best International Film at the 58th Ann Arbor Film Festival.

Samarasinghe's debut feature film, Your Touch Makes Others Invisible, a hybrid documentary investigating the history of enforced disappearances during the Sri Lankan Civil War, has received support from the Sundance Institute and Berlinale Talents.

In 2020, he was named one of Filmmaker Magazine’s 25 New Faces of Independent Film and in 2021 he had a solo exhibition at the Museum of Modern Art.

References

External links 

 
 Rajee Samarasinghe - Filmmaker Magazine’s 25 New Faces of Independent Film

1988 births
Sri Lankan filmmakers
Living people
California Institute of the Arts alumni
American people of Sri Lankan descent